Early parliamentary elections were held in Nauru on 24 January 1987. The Parliament elected in December 1986 had nine supporters of Kennan Adeang and nine of former president Hammer DeRoburt. The resulting deadlock was broken when Adeang supporter Kinza Clodumar switched sides, resulting in Parliament being dissolved. As there were no political parties, all of the fifty-plus candidates ran as independents. Voter turnout was 92.67%.

Supporters of President Hammer DeRoburt were won eleven of the eighteen seats, resulting in him being re-elected 
as President.

Results

References

Nauru
1987 in Nauru
Elections in Nauru
Non-partisan elections